Eliminalia (rebranded as 'Idata Protection' in January 2023 ) is a Spanish company specialized in reputation management. It was founded in 2011 by Diego Sánchez, known as Dídac Sánchez. The technical offices are in Kyiv, Ukraine. Eliminalia is property of Maidan Holdings, a Miami-based holding company.

In 2015, Eliminalia offered its services without charge to anyone affected by the Ashley Madison data breach.

In 2020, Eliminalia received several vanity awards: Technology Innovator Awards 2020 by AI Global Media and Cyber Security Company of the Year by Corporate LiveWire.

In 2021, an NGO dedicated to the defense of digital rights, accused Eliminalia of creating a network of fake websites with back-dated articles and then spamming them with legal DMCA takedown notices and GDPR complaints. These were intended to take down articles referring to corruption in Angola regarding Isabel dos Santos and Vincent Miclet.

Internal documents leak

In 2023, after a news leak of approx. 50 000 internal documents to French nonprofit Forbidden Stories, the company was accused of using ‘blackhat tactics’ help clients in 50 countries, including torturers, convicted criminals, corrupt politicians, scammers and spyware companies to erase their past from the internet. Eliminalia allegedly uses an array of underhanded tactics to stifle criticism of its clients, from intimidating journalists to churning out fake news on websites such as 'Taiwan Times', 'Mayday Washington', 'CNN News Today', and 'London Uncensored' - all of which are connected to Maidan Holdings (Eliminalia's parent company). 

Using falsified copyright infringement notices, the company manipulates “right to be forgotten” laws, designed to protect people from malicious material online, by sending emails that appear to be from the European Commission to journalists and publishers of the unwanted articles. Two clients of Eliminalia are convicted drug traffickers; other clients included Venezuela officials, Malchas Tetruashvili (convicted of money laundering for Georgian mafia boss Tariel Oniani in 2019), José Mestré (convicted of cocaine trafficking in 2010), former bank officials at Banca Privada d'Andorra, as well as 'scammers, spyware companies, torturers, convicted criminals, corrupt politicians and others in the global underworld'. One has been charged with laundering money for a prostitution ring. Another sold U.S. equipment to the Syrian government. Three more are indicted for helping carry out a cryptocurrency scam that stole billions of dollars from investors.

As of January 2023, it appears that Eliminalia has rebranded as 'Idata Protection'.

References

Companies of Spain
2011 establishments in Spain
Reputation management companies